Pectinitarsus holomelas is a species of beetle in the family Carabidae, the only species in the genus Pectinitarsus.

References

Lebiinae